Colorado's 29th Senate district is one of 35 districts in the Colorado Senate. It has been represented by Democrat Janet Buckner since 2023. Prior to redistricting the district was represented by Democrats Rhonda Fields and Morgan Carroll.

Geography
District 29 is based in northern and central Aurora, also covering several rural communities in eastern Arapahoe County including Bennett, Byers, and Strasburg.

The district is located in between Colorado's 6th congressional district and 4th district; while much of the land is in the 4th, the bulk of the district's population resides in the 6th. It overlaps with the 36th, 42nd, and 56th districts of the Colorado House of Representatives.

Recent election results
Colorado state senators are elected to staggered four-year terms; under normal circumstances, the 29th district holds elections in presidential years.

2020

2016

2012

Federal and statewide results in District 29

References 

29
Arapahoe County, Colorado